Taipingqiao Park is a park in Huangpu District, Shanghai, China. In the center of the park is a man-made lake called Taiping Lake.

References

External links
 

Huangpu District, Shanghai
Parks in Shanghai